Alexander McCurdie (7 January 1895 – 24 April 1917) was a Scottish professional footballer who played as a centre forward in the Scottish League for Kilmarnock.

Personal life 
McCurdie attended Glasgow University. In May 1915, 9 months after Britain's entry into the First World War, McCurdie enlisted in the Argyll and Sutherland Highlanders. He arrived on the Western Front in June 1916 and saw action at the Battle of the Ancre five months later. By April 1917, he had been promoted to acting lance-sergeant and had been recommended for the DCM. McCurdie was killed while on patrol in Beaucamps, Nord on 24 April 1917 and he was buried in Fifteen Ravine British Cemetery, Villers-Plouich.

Career statistics

References 

Scottish footballers
1917 deaths
British Army personnel of World War I
British military personnel killed in World War I
1895 births
Argyll and Sutherland Highlanders soldiers
Scottish Football League players
Kilmarnock F.C. players
Footballers from East Ayrshire
Association football forwards
Alumni of the University of Glasgow
Reading F.C. wartime guest players
Glasgow University F.C. players